The Possibilists, also called Broussists, were a faction of the French socialist movement led by Paul Brousse. Benoît Malon and others supported the faction although they did not always fully share its inspiring principles. It originated within the "Federation of the Socialist Workers' Party of France" (Fédération du parti des travailleurs socialistes de France), a Marxist-inspired organisation founded by Paul Lafargue, Jules Guesde and others, in Marseilles, in 1879. 

Brousse opposed Marxist tactics and proclaimed the reformist principle of directing everyday political activity towards achieving the goals that were concretely 'possible' time by time, while maintaining that socialists should keep always ready to jump at future revolutionary opportunities. 

The Possibilists soon won a majority within the Federation, inducing the Marxists to split and found their new French Workers' Party (Parti ouvrier français, POF) in 1882. The Federation was initially renamed the Revolutionary Socialist Workers' Party, and then commonly the Federation of the Socialist Workers of France (Fédération des travailleurs socialistes de France). 
 
In 1902 the small political party of the Possibilists and other groups united in the
French Socialist Party, which three years later merged into the French Section of the Workers' International (Section française de l'Internationale ouvrière'', SFIO).

References

See also
 Libertarian possibilism
 Federation of the Socialist Workers of France 1879-1905
 French Section of the Workers' International 1905-1969
 French Socialist Party 1969-
 History of communism
 History of socialism
 History of the Left in France
Minimum program

Political parties of the French Third Republic
History of socialism
Socialist parties in France